Him or Me is a 1930 German comedy action film directed by Harry Piel and starring Piel, Valerie Boothby and Hans Junkermann. It marked the sound debut of Piel, a popular star of adventure films during the silent era.

The film's sets were designed by the art directors Robert Neppach and Erwin Scharf. Location shooting took place in Northern Italy, the Netherlands and the French Riviera.

Cast

References

Bibliography

External links 
 

1930 films
1930s action comedy films
German action comedy films
Films of the Weimar Republic
1930s German-language films
Films directed by Harry Piel
German black-and-white films
1930 comedy films
1930s German films